The 15 cm Nebelwerfer 41 (15 cm NbW 41) was a German multiple rocket launcher used in the Second World War. It served with units of the Nebeltruppen, German Chemical Corps units that had the responsibility for poison gas and smoke weapons that were also used to deliver high-explosives during the war. The name Nebelwerfer is best translated as "smoke mortar".

Allied troops nicknamed it Screaming Mimi and Moaning Minnie due to its distinctive sound.

Development 
Rocket development had begun during the 1920s and reached fruition in the late-1930s. These offered the opportunity for the Nebeltruppen to deliver large quantities of poison gas or smoke simultaneously. The first weapon to be delivered to the troops was the 15 cm Nebelwerfer 41 in 1940, after the Battle of France, a purpose-designed rocket with gas, smoke, and high-explosive warheads. It was fired from a six-tube launcher mounted on a towed carriage adapted from that used by the 3.7 cm PaK 36 to a range of 6,900 metres (7,500 yds), later also mounted on a halftrack as Panzerwerfer 42. Almost five and a half million 15 cm rockets and six thousand launchers were manufactured over the course of the war.

Ammunition 
Like virtually all German rocket designs, 15 cm Wurfgranate 41 projectiles were spin-stabilized to increase accuracy.  However, one unusual feature was that the rocket motor was in the front, the exhaust venturis being about two-thirds down the body from the nose, with the intent to optimize the blast and fragmentation effect of the rocket as the warhead would still be above the ground when it detonated. This proved to greatly complicate manufacture without much improvement and it was not copied on later rocket designs.  The motor consisted of seven sticks of solid-fuel propellant and the exhaust ring had twenty-six venturis that were drilled at a 14° angle to impart spin. There were high-explosive, smoke and chemical warfare rockets available.  The chemical warfare rockets were stockpiled but are said to have not been used operationally. Field Rocket Equipment of the German Army 1939-45 lists Phosgene Gas and Mustard Gas as the two primary chemical agents but it does not describe how the rockets were identified with color coded rings. German and Japanese Solid-Fuel Rocket Weapons describes the color coding for the rockets but only gives cryptic codes like M/HA for the type of chemical agent it was filled with.

Photo gallery

Notes

References 

 
 Engelmann, Joachim. German Rocket Launchers in WWII. Schiffer Publishing, 1990

External links 

 Germany's Rocket and Recoilless Weapons from the U.S. Intelligence Bulletin, March 1945
 15 cm Nebelwerfer 41 , Catalog of Enemy Ordnance, 1945.

Rocket artillery
World War II artillery of Germany
150 mm artillery
Weapons and ammunition introduced in 1940
de:Nebelwerfer#15-cm-Nebelwerfer 41